Furjanići is a village near Ozalj, Karlovac County, Croatia.

Location 
It is situated 20 km from Karlovac and 6 km northwest of Ozalj, on the left bank of the river Kupa.

Historical population

References 

Populated places in Karlovac County